The Presidential Parastatal Sector Reform Commission is the organ of the Government of Tanzania under the Public Corporations Act, 1992 as amended in 1993 and 1999, to co-ordinate implementation of the government's economic reform efforts in the form of privatisation.

External links
Parastatal Sector Reform Commission - Official Website
Parastatal Sector Reform Commission page at President of Tanzania website

Government of Tanzania
Economy of Tanzania